{{Infobox animanga/Print
| type            = manga
| author          = Ghost Mikawa
| illustrator     = Yumika Kanade
| publisher       = Kadokawa Shoten
| publisher_en    = 
| demographic     = Shōnen
| magazine        = Shōnen Ace Plus
| first           = July 16, 2021
| last            = 
| volumes         = 2
| volume_list     = #Manga
}}

 is a Japanese mixed-media project created by Ghost Mikawa. It started with a YouTube channel created in April 2020, with its first video uploaded on May 1, 2020. A light novel series is written by Ghost Mikawa and illustrated by Hiten. The series began publication by Media Factory under their MF Bunko J imprint in January 2021. A manga adaptation by Yumika Kanade began serialization online in Kadokawa Shoten's Shōnen Ace Plus in July 2021. An anime television series adaptation has been announced.

Premise
After his father's remarriage, Yūta Asamura finds himself getting a new step-sister Saki Ayase, who happens to be the number one beauty of her grade, and lives together with her. Having learned the important values about man-woman relationships, seen through their parents, and in order to not cause discord in the family, Yūta and Saki promise to keep a reasonable distance from each other, not to be too close or too opposing. Saki, who is longing for affection from her family and worked in solitude for their sake, does not know how to depend on others, while Yūta is bewildered at how to properly connect to Saki as her older brother. Feeling somewhat similar, the two of them gradually feel comfortable living together.

Characters

The protagonist of the Gimai Seikatsu series. He is Saki Ayase's step-brother and a second-year high school student.

The female lead of the series. She is Yuuta Asamura's step-sister and a second-year high school student.

Yuuta Asamura's classmate and only friend at school. He is a member of the baseball team and an otaku.

Saki Ayase's classmate. She is always cheerful and meddlesome. She got increasingly involved with Saki because couldn't stand to see her isolated, and later became her friend. They are often seen together in school.

A university student and works part-time as a senior in the same bookstore where Yuuta Asamura works.

Yuuta Asamura's biological father and Saki Ayase's step-father. After divorcing from his ex-wife for various reasons, he remarried Akiko Ayase. He has a good relationship with Yuuta and Saki.

Saki Ayase's biological mother and Yuuta Asamura's step-mother. After her divorce from her ex-husband, she worked tirelessly and raised Saki by herself until she remarried Taichi Asamura.

Media
YouTube channel
While writing several works, author Ghost Mikawa learned of the existence of a reader who had a request to "deeply dig into the daily life of the characters". He was interested in seeing what would happen if he tried to write an unusual work, and decided to write a story depicting the relationship between step-siblings.

Regarding the production of the videos, Mikawa is the original author of the Gimai Seikatsu storyline, but the script of the story is handled by multiple writers. According to Mikawa, the writing style of each writer is shown in each script, so it is often taken as it is.

All videos on the YouTube channel are subtitled in English, 

Light novels
The light novel series is written by Ghost Mikawa and features illustrations by Hiten. It is published by Media Factory under their MF Bunko J imprint, with the first volume being released on January 25, 2021; six volumes have been released as of August 25, 2022.

Manga
A manga adaptation with art by Yumika Kanade began serialization in Kadokawa Shoten's Shōnen Ace Plus online web service on July 16, 2021.

Anime
On July 24, 2022, during the "Natsu no Gakuensai 2022" event for MF Bunko J, an anime television series adaptation was announced.

See also
 My Friend's Little Sister Has It In for Me!'', another light novel series by the same author.

References

External links
Official YouTube channel 
 
 
Official Twitter account 

2021 Japanese novels
Anime and manga based on light novels
Japanese webcomics
Kadokawa Dwango franchises
Kadokawa Shoten manga
Light novels
MF Bunko J
Shōnen manga
Upcoming anime television series
Webcomics in print
YouTube channels